Edith Coleridge (1832  24 January 1911) was a British author. She edited The Memoir and Letters of Sara Coleridge (1873), a popular biography of her mother. An archive of her collected works is held at the Henry Ransom Center at the University of Texas at Austin.

Biography 
Edith Coleridge was the daughter of writer Sara Coleridge, who in turn was the daughter of poet Samuel Taylor Coleridge. Sara Coleridge married her cousin Henry Nelson Coleridge, who was Samuel Taylor Coleridge's literary executor. Edith had a brother, Herbert Coleridge.

References

External links 
Collected papers at the Harry Ransom Center

1832 births
1911 deaths
19th-century British writers
19th-century British women writers
British biographers
Women biographers